Shumkovo is a rural locality (a village) in Zaboryinskoye Rural Settlement, Beryozovsky District, Perm Krai, Russia. The population was 12 as of 2010.

Geography 
Shumkovo is located on the Shakva River, 4 km southwest of  Beryozovka, the district's administrative centre, by road. Klychi and Pirozhkovo are the nearest rural localities.

References 

Rural localities in Beryozovsky District, Perm Krai